Léon Wurmser (31 January 1931 – February 15, 2020) was a Swiss psychoanalyst, Clinical Professor of Psychiatry at West Virginia University and a training and supervising analyst of the New York Freudian Society. He was formerly Professor of Psychiatry and Director of the Alcohol and Drug Abuse Program at University of Maryland, Baltimore.

Career
Wurmser was born in Zurich. He was the author of more than 350 scientific papers, 15 books, and several book chapters and essays. His works deal with issues of masochism and depression, focusing on problems of shame, guilt, resentment, and the "archaic superego," both in the individual and in culture, religion, and history.  Wurmser has written papers and one book on Judaism: The World of Ideas and Values of Judaism: A Psychoanalytic View (published in German).  He also dealt with the understanding and treatment of drug addicts, drawing on his experience running drug rehabilitation programs for addicts.  In recent years, he has published several papers and one book on jealousy and envy, in partnership with German psychoananalyst Dr. Heidrun Jarass.

His approach to psychoanalysis was Freudian. His major works, published in English and German, include The Mask Of Shame, published in 1981 and frequently reprinted; "The Hidden Dimension: Psychodynamics of Compulsive Drug Use " (1978) on the psychodynamics of drug addiction; The Power of the Inner Judge (2000); and Torment Me, But Don't Abandon Me: Psychoanalysis of the Severe Neuroses in a New Key  (2007).

In 2004, Wurmser was awarded the Journal of the American Psychoanalytic Association'''s Journal Prize for a paper titled Psychoanalytic Reflections on 9/11, Terrorism and Genocidal Prejudice: Roots and Sequels.

He resided in Towson, Maryland, where he maintained a private practice.  He supervised colleagues in the United States and in Europe in psychoanalysis and psychotherapy. He lectured in Europe and was an honorary member of a number of psychoanalytic societies in Germany and in Austria.

Books
Wurmser, L. "The Power of the Inner Judge: Psychodynamic Treatment of the Severe Neuroses"  (New York, J. Aronson, 2000) 0765701774
Wurmser, Leon. "Das Rätsel des Masochismus" (Berlin: Springer, 1993) 3540637397
Wurmser, Leon. "Raubmörder and Räuber, Kriminalistik," 1959
Wurmser, Leon. "The Hidden Dimension" : Psychodynamics in Compulsive Drug Use" (New York : J. Aronson,  1978, republished 1995. (English and German eds. cited by 81 articles on Web of Science) 0876683081
Wurmser, Leon, co-editor with G. Balis et al.  "Psychiatric Foundations of Medicine" Volumes I - VI. (Butterworth, 1978)
Wurmser, Leon. "The Mask of Shame" Johns Hopkins Press, 1981, republished 1994, Jason Aronson.  080182527X,
translated into German as "Die Maske der Scham" Berlin: Springer, 1990)  (English and German eds. cited by 271 articles on Web of Science)
Wurmser, Leon. "Flucht vor dem Gewissen" –– Analyse von Über-Ich  und Abwehr bei schweren Neurosen, Springer-Verlag, Heidelberg, 1987, 1993, V & R 2000
Wurmser, Leon.  "Die zerbrochene Wirklichkeit –– Psychoanalyse als das Studium von Konflikt und Komplementarität" Springer Verlag, Heidelberg, 1989, 1993, V & R 2001/2002
Wurmser, Leon. "Die Maske der Scham" (translated, revised and enlarged version of Mask of Shame, 1981) Springer Verlag, Heidelberg, March, 1990, 1993, 1997
Wurmser, Leon. "Das Rätsel des Masochismus" 1993, Springer-Verlag Die verborgene Dimension: 1997  Vandenhoeck & Ruprecht.      
Wurmser, Leon.  "The Hidden Dimension"
Wurmser, Leon. "Magische Verwandlung und tragische Verwandlung. Die Behandlung der schweren Neurose." Vandenhoeck & Ruprecht, 1999
Wurmser, Leon. "Die eigenen verborgensten Dunkelgänge." Mit Fr. H. Gidion. Vandenhoeck & Ruprecht, 1999
Wurmser, Leon. "The Power of the Inner Judge." Jason Aronson, 2000
Wurmser, Leon. "Flight from Conscience" (unpublished)
Wurmser, Leon. "Ideen- und Wertewelt des Judentums. Eine psychoanalytische Sicht." Vandenhoeck & Ruprecht, 2001
Wurmser, Leon. "Torment me, but do not abandon me."  2007, Rowman & Littlefield
Wurmser, Leon and Heidrun Jarass: "Jealousy and Envy ––  New Views about Two Powerful Feelings." Monograph, Psychoanalytic Inquiry, Francis & Taylor;  2007
Wurmser, Leon. "Scham und der böse Blick", Kohlhammer Verlag, 2011.
Wurmser, Leon, ed. "Psychoanalytic Inquiry": "Superego Revisited –– Relevant or Irrelevant", 2004
Wurmser, Leon, Jarass, Heidrun, ed., "Nothing Good is Allowed to Stand - An Integrative View of the Negative Therapeutic Reaction" - Routledge, 2013

Selected journal articles
Wurmser, L. "A defense of the use of metaphor in analytic theory formation"  Psychoanalytic Quarterly, 46:466-498.	(1977)
Wurmser, L. Psychoanalytic Considerations of the Etiology of Compulsive Drug... J. Amer. Psychoanal. Association, 22:820-843. (1974) (cited by 125  articles on Web of Science)
Wurmser, Leon "Abyss Calls Out to Abyss": Oedipal Shame, Invisibility, and Broken Identity" The American Journal of Psychoanalysis''   63:4    (Dec. 2003.)
Wurmser, Leon. "Flight from conscience: experiences with the psychoanalytic treatment of compulsive drug users." Journal of Substance Abuse Treatment 4:157-168. (2001)

References

 Rogalski CJ.	"An educational program for the assessment and development of psychological-mindedness in the chemically dependent."
 Int J Addict. 1987 Feb; 22(2):103-13  (reference to his work as a standard).

1931 births
2020 deaths
American people of Swiss-Jewish descent
American psychoanalysts
Jewish American social scientists
Swiss emigrants to the United States
Swiss Jews
University of Maryland, Baltimore faculty
West Virginia University faculty
21st-century American Jews